The Viareggio Prize ( or ) is an Italian literary prize, first awarded in 1930. Named after the Tuscan city of Viareggio, it was conceived by three friends, Carlo Salsa and Leonida Rèpaci, to rival the Milanese Bagutta Prize.

List of recipients 
The first (or some cases equal-first) prizes have been awarded as follows:

From 1930 to 1947

From 1948 to present

Footnotes

Bibliography

References

External links
 

Italian literary awards
Prize
Awards established in 1930
1930 establishments in Italy